Stenelmis is the largest and most widespread genus of beetles in the family Elmidae. 

It contains the following species:
Stenelmis antennalis Sanderson, 1938
Stenelmis beameri Sanderson, 1938
Stenelmis bicarinata LeConte, 1852
Stenelmis calida Chandler, 1949
Stenelmis canaliculata (Gyllenhal, 1808)
Stenelmis concinna Sanderson, 1938
Stenelmis consobrina Dufour, 1835
Stenelmis cheryl Brown, 1987
Stenelmis convexula Sanderson, 1938
Stenelmis crenata (Say, 1824)
Stenelmis decorata Sanderson, 1938
Stenelmis douglasensis Sanderson, 1938
Stenelmis exigua Sanderson, 1938
Stenelmis exilis Sanderson, 1938
Stenelmis florala Schmude
Stenelmis fuscata Blatchley, 1925
Stenelmis gammoni White & Brown, 1976
Stenelmis grossa Sanderson, 1938
Stenelmis harleyi Schmude
Stenelmis humerosa
Stenelmis hungerfordi Sanderson, 1938
Stenelmis knobeli Sanderson, 1938
Stenelmis lariversi Schmude, 1999
Stenelmis lateralis Sanderson, 1938
Stenelmis lignicola 
Stenelmis mera Sanderson, 1938
Stenelmis mirabilis
Stenelmis lignicola
Stenelmis mera
Stenelmis mirabilis Sanderson, 1938
Stenelmis moapa 
Stenelmis musgravei
Stenelmis occidentalis Schmude and Brown, 1991
Stenelmis parva
Stenelmis puberula Reitter, 1887
Stenelmis quadrimaculata Horn, 1870
Stenelmis sandersoni Musgrave, 1940
Stenelmis sexlineata Sanderson, 1938
Stenelmis sinuata LeConte, 1852
Stenelmis vittipennis Zimmermann, 1869
Stenelmis williami 
Stenelmis xylonastis Schmude and Barr in Schmude, Barr and Brown, 1992

References 

Byrrhoidea genera
Elmidae
Taxonomy articles created by Polbot